INAS (International Sports Federation for Persons with Intellectual Disability; originally called INAS-FMH, later INAS-FID, INAS and now as Virtus Sport) was established in 1986 by professionals in the Netherlands who were involved in sport and wanted to promote the  participation of athletes with mental handicap in elite sports. The organisations brand name is the International Federation for Intellectual Impairment Sport, promoting sport worldwide for athletes with intellectual disability, autism and Down syndrome.

History 
The founding meeting of the first Executive Committee took place in January 1986 and the organisation became a member of the ICC – the International Coordinating Committee – the organisation that later became the International Paralympic Committee.

INAS’ original membership was just 14 nations which has steadily grown into c.80 nations today.

In 1989, the 1st World Games for Athletes with an Intellectual Disability were held in Harnosand, Sweden and in 1992, immediately after the Barcelona Paralympic Games, the first Paralympic Games for ‘Persons with mental handicap’ were held in Madrid.

In 1994, INAS-FMH became INAS-FID – the ‘International Sports Federation for Persons with Intellectual Disability’ and in 1996, for the first time, a small programme of events for athletes with an intellectual disability were included in the Paralympic Games in Atlanta.

A larger programme including Athletics, Swimming and Basketball was included in the Sydney Paralympic Games in 2000, but it soon emerged that a small number of athletes had cheated the system of determining eligibility, resulting in the suspension of events — a suspension that was to remain in place until 2009.

Despite exclusion from the Paralympic Games, the Inas sport programme continued to grow considerably to incorporate more than 10 sports whilst its membership grew to cover all 5 continents.

INAS provides competition opportunities for elite athletes with an intellectual disability in Paralympic and non-Paralympic sports and is different from Special Olympics, which provides non-elite opportunities worldwide.

Eligibility and classification 
Athletes with an intellectual disability are characterised by an IQ of 75 or below, significant limitations in Adaptive Behaviour and the disability must be present before the age of 18. This is based on the American Association for Intellectual and Developmental Disability definition of Intellectual Disability.

Approximately 1.5% of the population are thought to have an intellectual disability.

Current activities 
Today's sport programme includes some 15 annual events, more than 4000 athletes are registered to compete at an international level, whilst many hundreds of thousands of people with an intellectual disability have the opportunity to enjoy sport through the work of member organisations.

Following a partnership between INAS and the International Paralympic Committee to overhaul the process of determining athlete eligibility, events for athletes with an intellectual disability were re-instated to the Paralympic programme by the IPC General Assembly in November 2009, in preparation for the London 2012 Paralympic Games.

In 2019, INAS rebranded as Virtus.

Events

INAS World Championships
 Main article : INAS World Championships

Note : INAS do not organise events in Taekwondo but work in partnership with World Taekwondo World Para Taekwondo Championships.

 Source : 
 http://www.inas.org/events/results 
 http://www.inas.org/events

INAS Global Games 
 Main article : INAS Global Games

In 2004 INAS launched a new multi-sport competition INAS Global Games (INAS World Games / Intellectual Disability Global Games). The first event took place in Bollnäs, Sweden and featured more than 1000 athletes. The second Global Games took place in Czech Republic in 2009. With the re-inclusion of athletes with an intellectual disability into Paralympic competition, it was decided to move the Global Games to the year preceding the Paralympics. The next Global Games therefore takes place in 2011. After a bidding procedure, Italy was chosen as host nation. 2015 Global Games took place in Guayaquil, Ecuador, in September. The 2019 INAS Global Games will take place in Brisbane, Queensland Australia. 

Results : http://www.inas.org/events/results

INAS European Games 
 Main article : INAS European Games

Results : http://www.inas.org/event/2018-inas-european-games?instance_id=76

Regional Championships
2022 asian, african and american games for first time.

INAS European Championships
inas europe

prague2017.org

www.inas.global/europe/

References

External links 
 American Association for Intellectual and Developmental Disability
 Virtus World Intellectual Impairment Sport

Parasports organizations
Sports organizations established in 1986
International organisations based in the United Kingdom
Organisations based in Sheffield